Andrew Hurrell, FBA  was the Montague Burton Professor of International Relations and a Fellow of Balliol College, Oxford. He was educated at Gresham's School, Holt, Norfolk. He was previously a Faculty Fellow in International Relations at Nuffield College, Oxford. He is  Director of the Centre for International Studies at the Department of Politics and International Relations of the University of Oxford.

Previously, Hurrell taught at Johns Hopkins University center in Bologna, and at Christ Church, Oxford.

Hurrell is an expert on Brazil and has authored a large number of works on Latin American politics. He is a leading theorist of the 'International Society' approach pioneered at the London School of Economics (LSE) and Oxford by Hedley Bull, and has published widely on a vast range of international issues, from the United Nations and humanitarian intervention to international law. His current research project involves comparing the policies and outlooks of emerging regional powers such as Brazil and India, asking what their role in the shifting world order is likely to be.

Recent publications include: (co-editor with Ngaire Woods), Inequality, Globalization and World Politics  (Oxford University Press, 1999); Hedley Bull on International Society  (Macmillan 2000); and (co-editor with Rosemary Foot and John Gaddis), Order and Justice in International Relations  (Oxford University Press, 2003), On Global Order  (Oxford University Press, 2007).

Andrew Hurrell has been Montague Burton Professor of International Relations at Oxford University and a Fellow of Balliol College since 2008. He was elected to the British Academy in 2011 and to the Johns Hopkins Society of Scholars in 2010. He is a Delegate of Oxford University Press and a member of its Finance Committee.

His research interests cover theories of international relations; theories of global governance; the history of thought on international relations; comparative regionalism; and the international relations of the Americas, with particular reference to Brazil. In a recent survey of International Relations teaching and research in 20 countries he was one of only two non-US scholars listed as having produced the most interesting scholarship over the past five years.

His current work focuses on emerging powers and the globalization of international society and what this means for ideas and practices of global order, for IR theory, and for international normative theory. Collaborative projects include concerts of power in the 21st century; provincializing Westphalia; and ASEAN integration through law. On the topic of globalization, he has recorded an interview at the Einstein Foundation Berlin on how to correspond to it politically. He is also completing a short introduction to global governance. 

His book On Global Order. Power, Values and the Constitution of International Society (Oxford University Press) was the winner of International Studies Association Prize for Best Book in the field of International Relations in 2009. Other publications include (with Ngaire Woods), Inequality, Globalization and World Politics (1999); and (with Louise Fawcett), Regionalism in World Politics (1995).

References

External links
 Home page at Nuffield College, Oxford
 Home page at the New York University (NYU) Law School

British political scientists
Fellows of Nuffield College, Oxford
Fellows of Balliol College, Oxford
Johns Hopkins University faculty
Year of birth missing (living people)
Living people
Montague Burton Professors of International Relations (University of Oxford)
International relations scholars
Fellows of the British Academy
Alumni of St Antony's College, Oxford
People educated at Gresham's School